Scotorythra nesiotes, the Koʻolau giant looper moth, was a moth in the family Geometridae. The species was described by Perkins in 1901. It was endemic to Oʻahu, the Hawaiian Islands.

It had a wingspan of about 49 mm.

References

N
Endemic moths of Hawaii
Biota of Oahu
Moths described in 1901
Extinct insects since 1500
Taxonomy articles created by Polbot